The Battle of Anthony's Hill (also known as the Battle of King's Hill or the Battle of Devil's Gap) was an engagement that occurred December 25, 1864, in Tennessee during the American Civil War between combined Confederate cavalry and infantry units commanded by Maj. Gen. Nathan Bedford Forrest and Union forces commanded by Maj. Gen. James H. Wilson. The battle was a part of the Franklin–Nashville Campaign.

General Forrest had been assigned by Lt. General John B. Hood to the command of the rear guard of the Army of Tennessee, which was in flight following the military disaster experienced at the Battle of Nashville on December 15–16, 1864. After evacuating Pulaski, Tennessee, on the evening of December 24, Forrest was confronted with the problem of slowing Wilson's aggressive pursuit enough so that the Confederate army could complete the final  of its retreat to the Tennessee River.

Battle 
Believing he was pursuing an enemy ripe for capture, Wilson had his troops on the road early on Christmas Day. By 3:00 p.m. he was several miles south of Pulaski when he encountered Forrest's skirmishers. Without hesitation he sent in pursuit three regiments of dismounted cavalry into a heavily wooded gorge leading to the top of Anthony's Hill. Good progress was made until a rail barricade was encountered. Here Forrest had posted his two brigades of infantry and two brigades of cavalry along with three masked field pieces. In moments the Federal troops had been blasted back by heavy musketry in the direction from which they came, with Forrest's men in rapid pursuit. Soon they encountered an additional brigade of Wilson's troops who quickly joined the retreat. After capturing a Federal cannon, the Confederates continued in pursuit an additional half-mile until they struck a full division of Union cavalry. At this point Forrest had chosen to disengage. His victorious troops returned up the hill to their original positions at the barricades, and then finally withdrew under the cover of darkness further south to Sugar Creek.

Aftermath 
Forrest, who had already established a reputation for bold offensive action, displayed at Anthony's Hill an equal mastery of defensive warfare. His stands there and the following day at Sugar Creek bought important time for the stricken army to flee for safety behind the Tennessee River. That the Army of Tennessee survived to cross the river safely on December 26–28 barely hours ahead of their pursuers, and continued to fight into the following spring is due almost completely to Forrest's performance in delaying the Union pursuit.

Notes

References
 Sword, Wiley, The Confederacy's Last Hurrah: Spring Hill, Franklin, and Nashville, William Morrow & Co., 1974, .
 U.S. War Department, The War of the Rebellion: a Compilation of the Official Records of the Union and Confederate Armies, U.S. Government Printing Office, 1880–1901.

External links
 Order of Battle for Anthony's Hill
 Battle of Sugar Creek

Franklin–Nashville Campaign
Battles of the Western Theater of the American Civil War
Confederate victories of the American Civil War
Battles of the American Civil War in Tennessee
Giles County, Tennessee
Conflicts in 1864
1864 in Tennessee
Nathan Bedford Forrest
December 1864 events